The ’State Anthem of Coahuila' was published in 2003 by the government of Enrique Martínez y Martínez. It was composed by José Luis Ulloa Pedroza.

Lyrics 

Coahuila
Coahuila